David John Horadam (1883 – 5 May 1915) was a rugby union player who represented Australia.

Horadam, a prop, was born in Glendon, New South Wales and claimed 1 international rugby cap for Australia.

References

Australian rugby union players
Australia international rugby union players
1883 births
1915 deaths
Rugby union players from New South Wales
Rugby union props